Patrick McGilligan (born 1951) is an Irish American biographer, film historian and writer. His biography on Alfred Hitchcock, Alfred Hitchcock: A Life in Darkness and Light was a finalist for the Edgar Award. He is the author of two New York Times Notable Books, and he lives in Milwaukee, Wisconsin. He is also noted for his biography on Clint Eastwood, Clint: The Life and Legend, which reveals much about Eastwood which his official biography by Richard Schickel left out. In addition to Hitchcock and Eastwood, he has written biographies on Robert Altman, James Cagney, George Cukor, Fritz Lang, Oscar Micheaux, Jack Nicholson, Nicholas Ray, Orson Welles and Mel Brooks. He is also an editor of Backstory, which features interviews of Hollywood screenwriters and is published by the University of California Press.

Notable works
Funny Man: Mel Brooks
Clint: The Life and Legend
George Cukor: A Double Life
Alfred Hitchcock: A Life in Darkness and Light
Fritz Lang: The Nature of the Beast
Oscar Micheaux: The Great and Only: The Life of America's First Black Filmmaker
Jack Nicholson: The Joker Is Wild
Nicholas Ray: The Glorious Failure of an American Director
Tender Comrades: A Backstory of the Hollywood Blacklist with Paul Buhle

References

External links
Photograph
Writing at Film International

American film historians
American people of Irish descent
Writers from Milwaukee
1951 births
Living people
20th-century American biographers
20th-century American historians
20th-century American male writers
21st-century American biographers
21st-century American historians
21st-century American male writers
American male non-fiction writers